Sinikka Mirjam Kurkinen (born 1935) is a Finnish painter. She studied in Helsinki and Paris.

Kurkinen was born in Joutseno, South Karelia. She gave her first exhibitions in Imatra in 1955 and in Helsinki in 1958. Her works can be seen at Ateneum, the Imatra Museum of Art and in various other locations all over the country.

Kurkinen is an honorary member of the Imatra Art Association. She has won many awards during her career, including the Art Prize of Imatra in 1983.

References

External links 
 CV (in Finnish)

1935 births
Living people
People from Lappeenranta
21st-century Finnish women artists
20th-century Finnish women artists
Finnish women painters